Kai Lagesen (born 26 February 1965) is a Norwegian footballer. He played in two matches for the Norway national football team from 1986 to 1987.

References

External links
 

1965 births
Living people
Norwegian footballers
Norway international footballers
Place of birth missing (living people)
Association footballers not categorized by position